Gale Mastrofrancesco (born October 25, 1960) is an American politician who has served in the Connecticut House of Representatives from the 80th district since 2019.

References

1960 births
Living people
Republican Party members of the Connecticut House of Representatives
21st-century American politicians